Domenico Flabanico (died 1043) was the 29th Doge of Venice. His reign lasted from the abdication of Pietro Barbolano in 1032 until his death.

Before Domenico Flabanico took office, there was significant chaos in Venice. His predecessor had abdicated the position of Doge following extensive public pressure to reinstate Otto Orseolo, but when it was found out that Otto Orseolo was dying, Domenico Orseolo, Otto's less popular relative, attempted to seize the dogeship. There was public outcry in Venice regarding the apparent onset of a nepotistic hereditary monarchy. Flabanico, a successful merchant and popular individual, but less than noble, was elected to spite the notion that royal blood was required for the position.

Under Flabanico, new laws to limit the powers of the Doge against creating a hereditary monarchy were passed. Venice went through a period of infighting and decline. Flabanico struggled to maintain the diplomatic relationships that were necessary for adequate foreign policy. The economy of the Republic of Venice also suffered under his leadership. Under his successor, Domenico Contarini, the Republic was restored to a new era of prosperity. He died in 1043, at the end of more than a decade of rule.

See also
List of Doges of Venice
History of the Republic of Venice

References

External links
Treccani Italian Biographical Dictionary

1043 deaths
11th-century Doges of Venice
Year of birth unknown